Pesisir Barat Regency (literally West Coast Regency) is a new regency in Lampung Province of Indonesia.  It was created on 25 October 2012 from the eight western districts of West Lampung Regency.  It covers an area of 2,907.23 km2, and had a population of 141,741 at the 2010 Census and 162,697 at the 2020 Census; the official estimate as at mid 2021 was 163,640. The administrative centre is the town of Krui. The majority group in the Pesisir Barat Regency are the Lampung people.

Administrative districts

In 2012 the new regency comprised eight districts (kecamatan) which until 2012 were part of the West Lampung Regency, but since 2012 three additional districts have been created in the northern half of the new regency out of parts of the existing districts - Krui Selatan (South Krui), Pulau Pisang (Pisang Island) and Way Krui. These are all listed below (from northwest to southeast) with their areas and their populations at the 2010 Census and the 2020 Census, together with the official estimates as at mid 2021. The table also includes the locations of the district administrative centres, the number of villages (rural desa and urban kelurahan) in each district, and its post code.

Notes: (a) the 2010 population of the new Pulau Pisang District is included in the figure for Pesisir Utara District. The new Pulau Pisang District comprises the offshore island of the same name, adjacent to the coast of Karya Penggawa District. (b) the 2010 populations of the new Way Krui District and Krui Selatan District are included in the figure for Pesisir Tengah District.

History
Umpu Ratu Selalau Sanghyang Sangun Gukhu 21 Ramadhan 828 Mujarrad Rasulullah SAW up to 962 Hij, he was the figure of Mujahid Spreader of Islam Sultan Kepaksian Pernong Sekala Brak in Istana Gedung Dalom Batu Brak.

Queen Umpu Selalau Shangyang Sangun Gukhu was buried in the cemetery of Tambak Bata, In one proof in the Krui Pesisir Barat Regency, the footprints were printed on a stone named Maqom Selalau and the boat during the meeting and conquered the ruler of Bunian Matu, Maqom then became a benchmark for the region, starting from always to the sugar cane bordering the Limau River Kingdom, which was a Kepaksian Nyerupa area, when starting from Maqom, it continued Suwoh, Tanggamus Regency, Lampung Selatan Regency and Batu Brak, which is the area of Kepaksian Pernong Sekala Brak.

Pesisir Barat Regency was officially established since 2012 based on the Law of the Republik of Indonesia Number 22 of 2012 concerning the Establishment of West Coastal Regency in Lampung Province (State Gazette of the Republik of Indonesia 2012 Number 231 Supplement to State Gazette Number 5364).

Before the birth of the West Coastal Regency based on the above law, the West Coastal Regency was still a region of the West Lampung Regency Government whose district capital was in Liwa.

Airport
In early October 2011, the runway tested has been done and the testers concluded that the airport is ready for operation. The airport laid in 50 hectares of land with a 974-meter-long runway, an apron, taxi way, administration building and 1,800 meter road leading to the airport and is located at Seray village, Pesisir Tengah district. It hopes of boosting tourism and precaution in cases of natural disaster.

Dolphin conservation
Inline with traditional wisdom which prohibits people from catching dolphins, there are hundreds of dolphins surrounding Betuah Island and Banana Island with a tendency to increase in number year by year.

Tanjung Setia Beach
Tanjung Setia Beach faces the Indian Ocean, 273 kilometers from Bandar Lampung and takes 6 to 7 hours drive. The waves is 6 to 7 meters high and 200 meters long in June to August every year, suitable for world surfers and is categorized same as Hawaii. Several kilometers from the beach are found blue marlin up to 70 kilograms (170 centimeters).

References

2012 establishments in Indonesia
Regencies of Lampung